Ivan Petrovich Rybkin (born 20 October 1946) is a Russian politician. He was Chairman of Russia's State Duma in 1994–96 and Secretary of the Security Council in 1996–98. He ran for the Russian presidency in 2004, before dropping out after allegedly being kidnapped and drugged by Russian state Federal Security Service (FSB) officers.

Early life
He was born in village of Semigorka, Voronesh Oblast. In 1968, Rybkin graduated from Volgograd Agricultural Institute, and in 1991 from the Soviet Academy of Social Sciences.

Political career
After a career on lower ranks of the Communist Party, Rybkin was elected as peoples' deputy to the congress of the Russian Soviet Federated Socialist Republic in 1990. In 1993, Rybkin became a member of the Agrarian Party of Russia. That very year in December, he was elected deputy of the State Duma.

Speaker of Russian State Duma
In 1994, Rybkin was elected speaker of the State Duma. In January 1995, he became a member of the Security Council of the Russian Federation. In July of that year, Rybkin became a leader of the Ivan Rybkin Bloc.

Ivan Rybkin Bloc got 1.39% of the vote in the 1995 Russian legislative election, falling short of a 5% electoral threshold. Its campaign video clip featured two cows who discussed fairness in a philosophical manner.

In March 1998, Rybkin was appointed Deputy Prime Minister for Commonwealth of Independent States affairs.

Presidential candidate and kidnapping

In 2004, Rybkin was nominated by Berezovsky's Liberal Party for the Russian presidential elections. During the campaign, on 2 February 2004, he accused incumbent President Vladimir Putin of organizing terrorist acts in Russia in 1999 and of being involved in shady business activities with Yury Kovalchuk, Mikhail Kovalchuk, Gennady Timchenko, KiNEx and the Russia Bank, which allegedly swallowed up a vast share of the nation's financial flows.

Rybkin's candidacy aligned itself strongly with Berezovsky's politics. While it was believed that Rybkin would, even optimistically, be unable to receive more than 2% of the vote, it was also believed that he might receive a sizable enough amount of funding from Berezovsky that he could orchestrate a significant amount of anti-Putin campaigning in advance of the election.

Many Russians had reported themselves to be too unfamiliar with Rybkin to have an opinion on him.

In February 2004, Rybkin disappeared for 4 days under mysterious circumstances. A day after his return he accused the Putin administration of complicity in the 1999 bomb attacks in Moscow that led to a war in the Russian breakaway republic of Chechnya. Five days later, Rybkin appeared in Kyiv. He stated later that he had been kidnapped and drugged by Russian FSB agents  who lured him to Ukraine promising to arrange meeting with the former Chechen leader Aslan Maskhadov. Upon arrival he was offered refreshments in the apartment, at which point he became "very drowsy."  After being unconscious, he woke up on 10 February.  Upon waking, he was shown a videotape in which he was performing "revolting acts" conducted by "horrible perverts".  He was told that the tape would be made public if he continued with his presidential campaign. According to Alexander Litvinenko, the FSB agents apparently treated Rybkin with their standard truth drug.

Rybkin said he feared for his safety if he returned to Russia, and whilst he initially continued the campaign from overseas, on 5 March 2004, he withdrew from the race, saying he did not want to be part of "this farce," as he called the elections.

References

1946 births
Living people
1st class Active State Councillors of the Russian Federation
People from Voronezh
20th-century Russian politicians
Deputy heads of government of the Russian Federation
Chairmen of the State Duma
Rybkin
First convocation members of the State Duma (Russian Federation)
Second convocation members of the State Duma (Russian Federation)